Crane Holdings, Co. is an American industrial products company based in Stamford, Connecticut.  Founded by Richard Teller Crane in 1855, it became one of the leading manufacturers of bathroom fixtures in the United States, until 1990, when that division was sold off. In 1960 it began the process of becoming a holding company with a diverse portfolio.  Its business segments are Aerospace & Electronics, Engineered Materials (fiberglass paneling and telecom equipment), Payment and Merchandising Technology (vending machines, payment technology, currency technology and printing), Fluid Handling, and Controls (sensing and control systems).  Industries served by these segments include chemical industries, commercial construction, food and beverage, general and commercial aviation, and power generation.

The company is best known to the consumer public as a large manufacturer of vending machines via its Crane Merchandising Systems subsidiary. Crane Co. has expanded their lineup of snack machines via their acquisitions of Glasco Polyvend Lektrovend (GPL) and Automatic Products (APi), which until 2017 were marketed as separate brands from Crane Co.'s main National line.  Crane Co. has also acquired Dixie-Narco from Maytag, adding a full lineup of soda machines to Crane Co.'s portfolio.

History
In 1855, brothers Richard and Charles Crane formed R. T. Crane & Bro., which manufactured and sold brass goods and plumbing supplies in Chicago, Illinois. The new company soon won contracts to supply pipe and steam-heating equipment in large public buildings such as the Cook County courthouse and the state prison at Joliet. In 1865, R. T. Crane and Brother was incorporated, and the name of the company was changed to the Northwestern Manufacturing Company. It began to manufacture a full line of industrial valves and fittings in cast iron, malleable iron and brass. By 1870, when it employed about 160 people, it was making elevators as well. After the Chicago Fire of 1871, the company decided to expand its operations. Just after the firm became Crane Bros. Manufacturing Co. in 1872, it employed as many as 700 men and boys and manufactured over $1 million worth of products per year.

In 1890, when it had sales branches in Omaha, Kansas City, Los Angeles and Philadelphia, the company changed its name to Crane Co. By this time, Crane was supplying much of the pipe used for the large central heating systems in Chicago's new skyscrapers, and it was also selling the enameled cast-iron products that were soon found in bathrooms in residences across the country.

In 1910, Crane had begun to manufacture at a plant in Bridgeport, Connecticut. A large new Chicago plant on South Kedzie Avenue was built in the 'teens which employed more than 5,000 people. During the 1920s, when Crane expanded overseas, the company was the world's leading manufacturer of valves and fittings. Company sales rose to over US$300 million per annum by the mid-1950s.

In 1959, the Crane family sold their control of the company, and the new owners began to turn Crane into a global conglomerate that made aerospace equipment in addition to their traditional place in the plumbing industry. Headquarters eventually moved from Chicago to Bridgeport. The Crane Plumbing unit was sold off in 1990.  Crane Plumbing is now a division of American Standard.

Products
 Controls (diagnostic, measurement, and control devices)
 Industrial
 Aerospace components (sensing and control systems)
 Engineered materials (Fiberglass Reinforced Plastic Wall & Ceiling Systems, Exteriors of RV sidewalls, Transportation Interiors)
 Fluid handling equipment (valves and pumps)
 Payment and Merchandising Technologies
 Automatic Payment Systems (Crane Payment Innovations, the result of merging former Crane Payment Solutions and MEI)
 Vending Machines (Crane Merchandising)
 Currency and Currency security features (Crane Currency)

Subsidiaries
 Crane Aerospace & Electronics
 Aerospace Group (Lynnwood, Washington)
 Burbank, California (Hydro-Aire and P. L. Porter)
 Elyria, Ohio (Lear Romec)
 Lynnwood, Washington (ELDEC)
 Lyon, France (ELDEC France)
 Electronics Group (Redmond, Washington)
 Beverly, Massachusetts (Signal Technology)
 Chandler, Arizona (Signal Technology)
 Fort Walton Beach, Florida (Keltec)
 West Caldwell, New Jersey (Merrimac Industries)
 Crane Composites
 Florence, Kentucky (Lasco)
 Goshen, Indiana (Noble & Fabwel)
 Joliet, Illinois (Kemlite)
 Jonesboro (Kemlite)
 Crane Electronics (headquarters located in Redmond, Washington)
 Albuquerque, New Mexico (General Technology Corporation)
 Beverly, Massachusetts (Signal Technology)
 Chandler, Arizona (Signal Technology)
 Fort Walton Beach, Florida (Keltec)
 Lynnwood, Washington (ELDEC)
 Lyon, France (ELDEC France)
 Redmond, Washington (Interpoint)
 Taiwan (Interpoint)
 Fluid Handling
 Crane ChemPharma Flow Solutions
 Crane Energy Flow Solutions
 Crane Australia
 Crane Stockham Valve Ltd. (Belfast)
 Crane Limited
 Crane Process Flow Technologies (CPFT)
 Crane Pumps and Systems (CP&S)
 Crane Supply
 Crane Valves North America (CVNA)
 Pacific Valves
 Resistoflex Industrial
 Valve Services
 Xomox
 Crane Nuclear, Inc.
 Friedrich Krombach GmbH Armaturenwerke
 Armature d.o.o. (Slovenia)
 Croning Livarna d.o.o.(Slovenia)
 W.T. Armatur GmbH
 Controls
 Azonix
 Barksdale
 Crane Environmental (with brands Cochrane, Chicago Heater and Environmental Products) - since divested to Newterra
 Fort Lauderdale, Florida (Dynalco)
 WMS
 Payment and Merchandising Technologies
Crane Currency
Crane Merchandising Systems
 Automatic Products (APi)
 Stentorfield
Dixie-Narco
 Glasco Polyvend Lektrovend (GPL)
 St Louis (National Vendors)
 Streamware
 Crane Payment Innovations (CPI)
 Money Controls
 CashCode
 Telequip
 MEI Conlux
 Conlux
 National Rejectors (NRI)
 Cummins Allison

Litigation
 In a 1917 U.S. Supreme Court case Looney v. Crane Co., the company was involved against the state of Texas. 
The Court held "that the franchise and permit taxes both violated the due process clause of the Fourteenth Amendment and directly burdened interstate commerce. A suit to enjoin state officials from enforcing an unconstitutional tax is not a suit against the state." 
The meaning of this ruling is that States are not allowed to add burdens to corporations if it impacts interstate commerce. This case has been cited in over 20 further Supreme Court rulings.

Asbestos Liabilities
As of December 31, 2007, Crane Co. faced 80,999 asbestos liability claims. In 2007, the company set aside $390 million for predicted asbestos liability costs through 2017.

See also 
 List of S&P 400 companies

References

External links

Crane Company Records at Newberry Library

Companies listed on the New York Stock Exchange
Companies based in Stamford, Connecticut
Vending machine manufacturers
Conglomerate companies of the United States